Come Down Dawn (subtitled Brooklyn to Mexico City 1990) is a 2021 reissue of the 1990 studio album Chill Out by British electronic music duo The KLF. Released to streaming services on 4 February 2021 under their alias The Justified Ancients of Mu Mu, it is the second in a series of six official compilations Samplecity thru Trancentral, after Solid State Logik 1 from 1 January 2021.

Come Down Dawn is the second commercial release of the KLF's music since the band deleted their entire catalog in 1992. The album is a re-edited version of the 1990 album Chill Out, with expired licensed samples from the original release removed in the mix.

Background 
The album continues the series of re-releases on music streaming platforms, announced on a graffiti and posters under a railway bridge on Kingsland Road in East London, following the release of Solid State Logik 1, the collection of remastered and re-edited hit singles, and videos published for the first time on YouTube.

Come Down Dawn is a re-edited version of the 1990 album Chill Out, with a selection of prominent samples from the original release removed. The omissions include a BBC Radio 1 jingle from the Friday Rock Show featuring Tommy Vance, and direct excerpts from a 1961 composition "Stranger on the Shore" by Acker Bilk, a 1968 song "Albatross" by Fleetwood Mac, a 1989 song "After the Love" by Jesus Loves You (both from "3 a.m. Somewhere out of Beaumont"), and a 1969 song "In the Ghetto" by Elvis Presley (from "Elvis on the Radio, Steel Guitar in My Soul").

The only addition on Come Down Dawn mixed into the original content of Chill Out is "What Time Is Love? (Virtual Reality Mix)," originally released on the KLF 1990 remix EP What Time Is Love? (Remodelled & Remixed).

Instead of original titles of Chill Out, all newly re-edited tracks on Come Down Dawn are retitled to signify, according to the band, subsequent stages of their 43-hour journey from 1990, that run "from the Reverend Doctor Wade’s tabernacle in Brooklyn to the Mesoamerican Pyramids near Mexico City.

All tracks were recorded live at their Trancentral studio in late 1989, and feature Graham Lee on pedal steel guitar.

Track listing

References 

2021 albums
The KLF albums
KLF Communications albums
Electronic albums by British artists